The 1908 Montana football team represented the University of Montana in the 1908 college football season. They were led by first-year head coach Roy White, and finished the season with a record of one win, two losses and one tie (1–2–1).

Schedule

References

Montana
Montana Grizzlies football seasons
Montana football